Einar Larsen (11 September 1904 – 24 September 1977) was a Norwegian footballer. He played in one match for the Norway national football team in 1927.

References

External links
 

1904 births
1977 deaths
Norwegian footballers
Norway international footballers
Place of birth missing
Association footballers not categorized by position